Autostrada A1 may refer to:
Autostrada A1 (Italy)
Autostrada A1 (Poland)